Carlos Alberto Silva Valente (born July 25, 1948 in Setúbal) is a retired Portuguese football referee. He is known for having refereed three matches in the FIFA World Cup, one in the 1986 and two in the 1990.

References
Profile

1948 births
Portuguese football referees
FIFA World Cup referees
1990 FIFA World Cup referees
Living people
1986 FIFA World Cup referees
Sportspeople from Setúbal